José María Plácido Caamaño y Gómez-Cornejo (5 October 1837 – 31 December 1900) was President of Ecuador 23 November 1883 to 1 July 1888. 

Caamaño was born in Guayaquil. He was the grandson of Spanish explorer Jacinto Caamaño. He studied law and theology in the seminary of his native city, and was educated in Quito. Subsequently he was mayor of Guayaquil, and chief of the custom-house service. He was a member of the Progresistas, a liberal Catholic party. 

He was banished in 1882, went to Lima, organized a revolutionary expedition with which he left Callao on 14 April 1883, and landed in Ecuadorian territory three days afterwards. He organized a division and joined the forces that were besieging Guayaquil about the middle of May. The place was taken by storm by the combined forces under Caamaño, Sarasti, Alfaro, and Salazar. The Progresistas came to power. 

A provisional government was appointed until the national convention could meet, and on 11 October 1883 he was elected president ad interim, and finally proclaimed him President of the Republic on 17 February 1884.

An attempt was made to assassinate him in 1886, and he narrowly escaped death by throwing himself into a river. Under his administration telegraphs, railways, an institute of sciences, several Colleges, and many new schools were added to the resources of Ecuador.

After his term ended, he served as ambassador to US from 1889 to 1890.

External links
 Official Website of the Ecuadorian Government about the country President's History

Presidents of Ecuador
1837 births
1900 deaths
Mayors of Guayaquil
Ambassadors of Ecuador to the United States
Ecuadorian people of Galician descent 
People from Guayaquil